Avenue Road is a busy shopping and commercial street in Bangalore, the state capital of Karnataka, India. It is located in Chickpet and runs through the heart of the city. It also connects the Mysore Road and K G Road in the city. It is in close proximity to Majestic bus station and Bangalore City Railway station.

Earlier, Avenue Road was known as Doddapete.

Avenue Road is known for its traditional trade in used books, garments and textiles, jewellery and pawn brokering.

Standing on Avenue Road, Bangalore Pete is also the Rice Memorial Church, Bangalore, named after Rev. Benjamin Holt Rice, a missionary of the London Missionary Society (LMS), a Canarese scholar and a pioneer of education in the Bangalore Pete region. The Church stands on the grounds of the London Mission Canarese Chapel which was established in 1834, by William Campbell.

See also
 Bengaluru Pete
 Rice Memorial Church, Bangalore

References

External links

Roads in Bangalore
Tourist attractions in Bangalore
Shopping districts and streets in India